Khyber Pakhtunkhwa (Urdu, Hindko: خیبر پختونخوا), commonly abbreviated as KP or KPK, is a province of Pakistan. Located in the northwestern region of the country, Khyber Pakhtunkhwa is the smallest province of Pakistan by land area and the third-largest province by population. It is bordered by the Pakistani provinces of Balochistan to the south, Punjab to the south-east, the territory of Gilgit-Baltistan to the north and north-east, Islamabad Capital Territory to the east and Azad Kashmir to the north-east. It shares an international border with Afghanistan to the west. Khyber Pakhtunkhwa has a varied landscape ranging from rugged mountain ranges, valleys, plains surrounded by hills, undulating submontane areas and dense agricultural farms.

While it is the third-largest Pakistani province in terms of both its population and its economy, it is geographically the smallest. The province is home to 17.9 percent of Pakistan's total population, with the majority of its inhabitants being Pashtuns.

Once a stronghold of Buddhism, Khyber Pakhtunkhwa is the site of the ancient region of Gandhara, including the ruins of the Gandharan capital of Pushkalavati (located near modern-day Charsadda). The region's history is characterized by frequent invasions by various empires, largely due to its geographical proximity to the historically important Khyber Pass.

Although it is colloquially known by a variety of other names, the name "Khyber Pakhtunkhwa" was brought into effect for the North-West Frontier Province in April 2010, following the passing of the 18th Constitutional Amendment. On 2 March 2017, the Pakistani government considered a proposal for a merger of the adjoining Federally Administered Tribal Areas (FATA) with Khyber Pakhtunkhwa as well as a repealing of the Frontier Crimes Regulation, which Pakistan had inherited following the partition of British India in 1947. However, some political parties opposed the merger, and instead called for the FATA to be reorganized as a separate province. However, on 24 May 2018, the National Assembly of Pakistan voted in favour of the 25th Constitutional Amendment, which would merge the FATA as well as the Provincially Administered Tribal Areas with Khyber Pakhtunkhwa. The Provincial Assembly of Khyber Pakhtunkhwa subsequently approved the bill on 28 May 2018; it was signed into law on 31 May by erstwhile Pakistani president Mamnoon Hussain, which officially completed the administrative merger process.

Etymology

Khyber Pakhtunkhwa  means the "Khyber side of the land of the Pashtuns," where the word Pakhtunkhwa means "Land of the Pashtuns", while according to some scholars, it refers to "Pashtun culture and society".

When the British established it as a province, they called it "North West Frontier Province" (abbreviated as NWFP) until 2010 due to its relative location being in the northwest of their Indian Empire. After the creation of Pakistan, Pakistan continued with this name but a Pashtun political party, Awami National Party based in the province demanded that the province name be changed to "Pakhtunkhwa". Their logic behind that demand was that Punjabi people, Sindhi people and Baloch people have their provinces named after their ethnicities but that is not the case for Pashtun people.

Pakistan Muslim League (N), the largest opposition party at the time was ready to change the province's name by supporting the ruling Pakistan Peoples Party and ANP, in a constitutional amendment but wanted to name the province something other than which does not carry only the Pashtun identity in it as they argued that there were other minor communities living in the province especially the Hazarewals of the Hazara region who spoke Hindko thus the word Khyber was introduced with the name because it is the name of a major pass which connects Pakistan to Afghanistan.

History

Early history 
During the times of Indus Valley civilisation (3300 BCE – 1700 BCE) the Khyber Pass through Hindu Kush provided a route to other neighbouring empires and was used by merchants on trade excursions. From 1500 BCE, Indo-Iranian peoples started to enter in the region from Central Asia after having passed the Khyber Pass.

The region of Gandhara, which was primarily based in the area of modern-day Khyber Pakhtunkhwa features prominently in the Rigveda, as well as the Zoroastrian Avesta, which mentions it as Vaēkərəta, the sixth most beautiful place on earth created by Ahura Mazda. It was one of the 16 Mahajanapadas of Vedic era. It was the centre of Vedic and later forms of Hinduism. Gandhara was frequently mentioned in Vedic epics, including Rig Veda, Ramayana and Mahabharata. It was the home of Gandhari, the princess of Gandhara Kingdom.

Alexander's conquests
In the spring of 327 BC Alexander the Great crossed the Indian Caucasus (Hindu Kush) and advanced to Nicaea, where Omphis, king of Taxila and other chiefs joined him. Alexander then dispatched part of his force through the valley of the Kabul River, while he himself advanced into Bajaur and Swat with his light troops. Craterus was ordered to fortify and repopulate Arigaion, probably in Bajaur, which its inhabitants had burnt and deserted. Having defeated the Aspasians, from whom he took 40,000 prisoners and 230,000 oxen, Alexander crossed the Gouraios (Panjkora) and entered the territory of the Assakenoi and laid siege to Massaga, which he took by storm. Ora and Bazira (possibly Bazar) soon fell. The people of Bazira fled to the rock Aornos, but Alexander made Embolima (possibly Amb) his base, and attacked the rock from there, which was captured after a desperate resistance.

Mauryan rule
Mauryan rule began with Chandragupta Maurya displacing the Nanda Empire, establishing the Mauryan Empire. A while after, Alexander's general Seleucus had attempted to once again invade the subcontinent from the Khyber pass hoping to take lands that Alexander had conquered, but never fully absorbed into this empire. Seleucus was defeated and the lands of Aria, Arachosia, Gandhara, and Gedrosia were ceded to the Mauryans in exchange for a matrimonial alliance and 500 elephants. With the defeat of the Greeks, the land was once more under Hindu rule. Chandragupta's son Bindusara further expanded the empire. However, it was Chandragupta's grandson Ashoka, who converted to Buddhism and made it the official state religion in Gandhara and also Pakhli, the modern Hazara, as evidenced by rock-inscriptions at Shahbazgarhi and Mansehra.

After Ashoka's death the Mauryan empire fell to pieces, just as in the west the Seleucid power was waning.

Indo-Greeks 

The Indo-Greek king Menander I (reigned 155–130 BCE) drove the Greco-Bactrians out of Gandhara and beyond the Hindu Kush, becoming king shortly after his victory.

His empire survived him in a fragmented manner until the last independent Greek king, Strato II, disappeared around 10 CE. Around 125 BCE, the Greco-Bactrian king Heliocles, son of Eucratides, fled from the Yuezhi invasion of Bactria and relocated to Gandhara, pushing the Indo-Greeks east of the Jhelum River. The last known Indo-Greek ruler was Theodamas, from the Bajaur area of Gandhara, mentioned on a 1st-century CE signet ring, bearing the Kharoṣṭhī inscription "Su Theodamasa" ("Su" was the Greek transliteration of the Kushan royal title "Shau" ("Shah" or "King")).

It is during this period that the fusion of Hellenistic and South Asian mythological, artistic and religious elements becomes most apparent, especially in the region of Gandhara.

Local Greek rulers still exercised a feeble and precarious power along the borderland, but the last vestige of the Greco-Indian rulers were finished by a people known to the old Chinese as the Yeuh-Chi.

Indo-Scythian Kingdom 

The Indo-Scythians were descended from the Sakas (Scythians) who migrated from Central Asia into South Asia from the middle of the 2nd century BCE to the 1st century BCE. They displaced the Indo-Greeks and ruled a kingdom that stretched from Gandhara to Mathura. The first Indo-Scythian king Maues established Saka hegemony by conquering  Indo-Greek territories. The power of the Saka rulers declined after the defeat to Chandragupta II of the Gupta Empire in the 4th century.

Indo-Parthian Kingdom 

The Indo-Parthian Kingdom was ruled by the Gondopharid dynasty, named after its first ruler Gondophares. For most of their history, the leading Gondopharid kings held Taxila (in the present Punjab province of Pakistan) as their residence, but during their last few years of existence the capital shifted between Kabul and Peshawar. These kings have traditionally been referred to as Indo-Parthians, as their coinage was often inspired by the Arsacid dynasty, but they probably belonged to a wider groups of Iranic tribes who lived east of Parthia proper, and there is no evidence that all the kings who assumed the title Gondophares, which means "Holder of Glory", were even related.

Kushan Empire

The Yuezhi nomads had driven the Sakas from the highlands of Central Asia, and were themselves forced southwards by the nomadic Xiongnu. One group, known as the Kushan, took the lead, and its chief, Kadphises I, seized vast territories extending south to the Kabul valley. His son Kadphises II conquered North-Western India, which he governed through his generals. His immediate successors were the fabled Hindu kings: Kanishka, Huvishka, and Vasushka or Vasudeva, of whom the first reigned over a territory which extended as far east as Benares, far south as Malwa, and also including Bactria and the Kabul valley. Their dates are still a matter of dispute, but it is beyond question that they reigned early in the Christian era. To this period may be ascribed the fine statues and bas-reliefs found in Gandhara  and Udyana. Under Huvishka's successor, Vasushka, the dominions of the Kushan kings shrank.

Turk and Hindu Shahis

The Turk Shahis ruled Gandhara until 870, when they were overthrown by the Hindu Shahis. The Hindu Shahis are believed to belong to the Uḍi/Oḍi tribe, namely the people of Oddiyana in Gandhara.

The first king Kallar had moved the capital into Udabandhapura from Kabul, in the modern village of Hund for its new capital. At its zenith, the kingdom stretched over the Kabul Valley, Gandhara and western Punjab under Jayapala. Jayapala saw a danger in the consolidation of the Ghaznavids and invaded their capital city of Ghazni both in the reign of Sebuktigin and in that of his son Mahmud, which initiated the Muslim Ghaznavid and Hindu Shahi struggles. Sebuk Tigin, however, defeated him, and he was forced to pay an indemnity. Jayapala defaulted on the payment and took to the battlefield once more. Jayapala however, lost control of the entire region between the Kabul Valley and Indus River.

However, the army was defeated in battle against the western forces, particularly against the Mahmud of Ghazni. In the year 1001, soon after Sultan Mahmud came to power and was occupied with the Qarakhanids north of the Hindu Kush, Jaipal attacked Ghazni once more and upon suffering yet another defeat by the powerful Ghaznavid forces, near present-day Peshawar.  After the Battle of Peshawar, he died because of regretting as his subjects brought disaster and disgrace to the Shahi dynasty.

Jayapala was succeeded by his son Anandapala, who along with other succeeding generations of the Shahiya dynasty took part in various unsuccessful campaigns against the advancing Ghaznvids but were unsuccessful. The Hindu rulers eventually exiled themselves to the Kashmir Siwalik Hills.

Ghaznavids
In 977, Sabuktagin founded the dynasty of the Ghaznavids. In 986 he raided the Indian frontier, and in 988 defeated Jaipal with his allies at Laghman. Soon afterwards he took control of the country as far as the Indus, placing a governor of his own at Peshawar. Mahmud of Ghazni, Sabuktagin's son, having secured the throne of Ghazni, again defeated Jayapala in his first raid into India (1001), Battle of Peshawar, and in a second expedition defeated Anandpal (1006), both near Peshawar. He also (1024 and 1025) raided the Pashtuns. Over time, Mahmud of Ghazni had pushed further into the subcontinent, as far as east as modern day Agra. During his campaigns, many Hindu temples and Buddhist monasteries had been looted and destroyed, as well as many people being forcibly converted into Islam. In 1179, Muhammad of Ghor took Peshawar, capturing Lahore from Khusrau Malik two years later.

Delhi sultanate
Following the invasion by the Ghurids, five unrelated heterogeneous dynasties ruled over the Delhi Sultanate sequentially: the Mamluk dynasty (1206–1290), the Khalji dynasty (1290–1320), the Tughlaq dynasty (1320–1414), the Sayyid dynasty (1414–1451), and the Lodi dynasty (1451–1526).

Meanwhile, the Pashtuns now appeared as a political factor. At the close of the fourteenth century they were firmly established in their present-day demographics south of Kohat, and in 1451 Bahlol Lodi's accession to the throne of Delhi gave them a dominant position in Northern India. Yusufzai tribes from the Kabul and Jalalabad valleys began migrating to the Valley of Peshawar beginning in the 15th century, and displaced the Swatis of the Bhittani confederation and Dilazak Pashtun tribes across the Indus River to Hazara Division.

Mughal empire

Mughal suzerainty over the Khyber Pakhtunkhwa region was partially established after Babar, the founder of the Mughal Empire, invaded the region in 1505 CE via the Khyber Pass. The Mughal Empire noted the importance of the region as a weak point in their empire's defenses, and determined to hold Peshawar and Kabul at all cost against any threats from the Uzbek Shaybanids.

He was forced to retreat westwards to Kabul but returned to defeat the Lodis in July 1526, when he captured Peshawar from Daulat Khan Lodi, though the region was never considered to be fully subjugated to the Mughals.

Under the reign of Babar's son, Humayun, a direct Mughal rule was briefly challenged with the rise of the Pashtun Emperor, Sher Shah Suri, who began construction of the famous Grand Trunk Road – which links Kabul, Afghanistan with Chittagong, Bangladesh over 2000 miles to the east. Later, local rulers once again pledged loyalty to the Mughal emperor.

Yusufzai tribes rose against Mughals during the Yusufzai Revolt of 1667, and engaged in pitched-battles with Mughal battalions in Peshawar and Attock. Afridi tribes resisted Aurangzeb rule during the Afridi Revolt of the 1670s. The Afridis massacred a Mughal battalion in the Khyber Pass in 1672 and shut the pass to lucrative trade routes. Following another massacre in the winter of 1673, Mughal armies led by Emperor Aurangzeb himself regained control of the entire area in 1674, and enticed tribal leaders with various awards in order to end the rebellion.

Referred to as the "Father of Pashto Literature" and hailing from the city of Akora Khattak, the warrior-poet Khushal Khan Khattak actively participated in the revolt against the Mughals and became renowned for his poems that celebrated the rebellious Pashtun warriors.

On 18 November 1738, Peshawar was captured from the Mughal governor Nawab Nasir Khan by the Afsharid armies during the Persian invasion of the Mughal Empire under Nader Shah.

Durrani Empire

The area fell subsequently under the rule of Ahmad Shah Durrani, founder of the Durrani Empire, following a grand nine-day long assembly of leaders, known as the loya jirga. In 1749, the Mughal ruler was induced to cede Sindh, the Punjab region and the important trans Indus River to Ahmad Shah in order to save his capital from the Durrani attack. Ahmad Shah invaded the remnants of the Mughal Empire a third time, and then a fourth, consolidating control over the Kashmir and Punjab regions. In 1757, he captured Delhi and sacked Mathura, but permitted the Mughal dynasty to remain in nominal control of the city as long as the ruler acknowledged Ahmad Shah's suzerainty over Punjab, Sindh, and Kashmir. Leaving his second son Timur Shah to safeguard his interests, Ahmad Shah left India to return to Afghanistan.

Their rule was interrupted by a brief invasion of the Hindu Marathas, who ruled over the region following the 1758 Battle of Peshawar for eleven months till early 1759 when the Durrani rule was re-established.

Under the reign of Timur Shah, the Mughal practice of using Kabul as a summer capital and Peshawar as a winter capital was reintroduced, Peshawar's Bala Hissar Fort served as the residence of Durrani kings during their winter stay in Peshawar.

Mahmud Shah Durrani became king, and quickly sought to seize Peshawar from his half-brother, Shah Shujah Durrani. Shah Shujah was then himself proclaimed king in 1803, and recaptured Peshawar while Mahmud Shah was imprisoned at Bala Hissar fort until his eventual escape. In 1809, the British sent an emissary to the court of Shah Shujah in Peshawar, marking the first diplomatic meeting between the British and Afghans. Mahmud Shah allied himself with the Barakzai Pashtuns, and amassed an army in 1809, and captured Peshawar from his half-brother, Shah Shujah, establishing Mahmud Shah's second reign, which lasted under 1818.

Sikh Empire
Ranjit Singh invaded Peshawar in 1818 and captured it from the Durrani Empire. The Sikh Empire based in Lahore did not immediately secure direct control of the Peshawar region, but rather paid nominal tribute to Jehandad Khan of Khattak, who was nominated by Ranjit Singh to be ruler of the region.

After Ranjit Singh's departure from the region, Khattak's rule was undermined and power seized by Yar Muhammad Khan. In 1823, Ranjit Singh returned to capture Peshawar, and was met by the armies of Azim Khan at Nowshera. Following the Sikh victory at the Battle of Nowshera, Ranjit Singh re-captured Peshawar. Rather than re-appointing Jehandad Khan of Khattak, Ranjit Singh selected Yar Muhammad Khan to once again rule the region.

The Sikh Empire annexed the Khyber Pakhtunkhwa region following advances from the armies of Hari Singh Nalwa. An 1835 attempt by Dost Muhammad Khan to re-occupy Peshawar failed when his army declined to engage in combat with the Dal Khalsa. Dost Muhammad Khan's son, Mohammad Akbar Khan engaged with Sikh forces the Battle of Jamrud of 1837, and failed to recapture it.

During Sikh rule, an Italian named Paolo Avitabile was appointed an administrator of Peshawar, and is remembered for having unleashed a reign of fear there. The city's famous Mahabat Khan, built in 1630 in the Jeweler's Bazaar, was badly damaged and desecrated by the Sikhs, who also rebuilt the Bala Hissar fort during their occupation of Peshawar.

British Raj 

British East India Company defeated the Sikhs during the Second Anglo-Sikh War in 1849, and incorporated small parts of the region into the Province of Punjab. While Peshawar was the site of a small revolt against British during the Mutiny of 1857, local Pashtun tribes throughout the region generally remained neutral or supportive of the British as they detested the Sikhs, in contrast to other parts of British India which rose up in revolt against the British. However, British control of parts of the region was routinely challenged by Wazir tribesmen in Waziristan and other Pashtun tribes, who resisted any foreign occupation until Pakistan was created. By the late 19th century, the official boundaries of Khyber Pakhtunkhwa region still had not been defined as the region was still claimed by the Kingdom of Afghanistan. It was only in 1893 The British demarcated the boundary with Afghanistan under a treaty agreed to by the Afghan king, Abdur Rahman Khan, following the Second Anglo-Afghan War. Several princely states within the boundaries of the region were allowed to maintain their autonomy under the terms of maintaining friendly ties with the British. As the British war effort during World War One demanded the reallocation of resources from British India to the European war fronts, some tribesmen from Afghanistan crossed the Durand Line in 1917 to attack British posts in an attempt to gain territory and weaken the legitimacy of the border. The validity of the Durand Line, however, was re-affirmed in 1919 by the Afghan government with the signing of the Treaty of Rawalpindi, which ended the Third Anglo-Afghan War – a war in which Waziri tribesmen allied themselves with the forces of Afghanistan's King Amanullah in their resistance to British rule. The Wazirs and other tribes, taking advantage of instability on the frontier, continued to resist British occupation until 1920 – even after Afghanistan had signed a peace treaty with the British.

British campaigns to subdue tribesmen along the Durand Line, as well as three Anglo-Afghan wars, made travel between Afghanistan and the densely populated heartlands of Khyber Pakhtunkhwa increasingly difficult. The two regions were largely isolated from one another from the start of the Second Anglo-Afghan War in 1878 until the start of World War II in 1939 when conflict along the Afghan frontier largely dissipated. Concurrently, the British continued their large public works projects in the region, and extended the Great Indian Peninsula Railway into the region, which connected the modern Khyber Pakhtunkhwa region to the plains of India to the east. Other projects, such as the Attock Bridge, Islamia College University, Khyber Railway, and establishment of cantonments in Peshawar, Kohat, Mardan, and Nowshera further cemented British rule in the region. In 1901, the British carved out the northwest portions of Punjab Province to create the Northwest Frontier Province (NWFP), which was renamed "Khyber Pakhtunkhwa" in 2010.

During this period, North-West Frontier Province was a "scene of repeated outrages on Hindus." During the independence period there was a Congress-led ministry in the province, which was led by secular Pashtun leaders, including Bacha Khan, who preferred joining India instead of Pakistan. The secular Pashtun leadership was also of the view that if joining India was not an option then they should espouse the cause of an independent ethnic Pashtun state rather than Pakistan. In June 1947, Mirzali Khan, Bacha Khan, and other Khudai Khidmatgars declared the Bannu Resolution, demanding that the Pashtuns be given a choice to have an independent state of Pashtunistan composing all Pashtun majority territories of British India, instead of being made to join the new state of Pakistan. However, the British Raj refused to comply with the demand of this resolution, as their departure from the region required regions under their control to choose either to join India or Pakistan, with no third option. By 1947 Pashtun nationalists were advocating for a united India, and no prominent voices advocated for a union with Afghanistan.

The secular stance of Bacha Khan had driven a wedge between the ulama of the otherwise pro-Congress (and pro-Indian unity) Jamiat Ulema Hind (JUH) and Bacha Khan's Khudai Khidmatgars.

There were other tensions in the area as well, particularly those that involved agitations by Pashtun tribesmen against the Imperial government. For example, in 1936, a British Indian court ruled against the marriage of a Hindu girl allegedly converted to Islam in Bannu, after the girl's family filed a case of abduction and forced conversion. The ruling was based on the fact that the girl was a minor and was asked to make her decision of conversion and marriage after she reaches the age of majority, till then she was asked to live with a third party. After the girl's family filed a case, the court ruled in the family's favor, angering the local Muslims who had later gone on to lead attacks against the Bannu Brigade.

Such controversies stirred up anti-Hindu sentiments amongst the province's Muslim population. By 1947 the majority of the ulama in the province began supporting the Muslim League's idea of Pakistan.

Immediately prior to 1947 Partition of India, the British held a referendum in the NWFP to allow voters to choose between joining India or Pakistan. The polling began on 6 July 1947 and the referendum results were made public on 20 July 1947. According to the official results, there were 572,798 registered voters, out of which 289,244 (99.02%) votes were cast in favor of Pakistan, while 2,874 (0.98%) were cast in favor of India. The Muslim League declared the results as valid since over half of all eligible voters backed the merger with Pakistan.

The then Chief Minister Dr. Khan Sahib, along with his brother Bacha Khan and the Khudai Khidmatgars, boycotted the referendum, citing that it did not have the options of the NWFP becoming independent or joining Afghanistan.

Their appeal for boycott had an effect, as according to an estimate, the total turnout for the referendum was 15% lower than the total turnout in the 1946 elections, although over half of all eligible voters backed merger with Pakistan.

Bacha Khan pledged allegiance to the new state of Pakistan in 1947, and thereafter abandoned his goals of an independent Pashtunistan and a united India in favor of supporting increased autonomy for the NWFP within Pakistan. He was subsequently arrested several times for his opposition to the strong centralized rule. He later claimed that "Pashtunistan was never a reality". The idea of Pashtunistan never helped Pashtuns and it only caused suffering for them. He further claimed that the "successive governments of Afghanistan only exploited the idea for their own political goals".

Post-independence 
There had been tensions between Pakistan and Afghanistan ever since Afghanistan voted against Pakistan's inclusion in the United Nations in 1948. After the creation of Pakistan in 1947, Afghanistan was the sole member of the United Nations to vote against Pakistan's accession to the UN because of Kabul's claim to the Pashtun territories on the Pakistani side of the Durand Line. Afghanistan's loya jirga of 1949 declared the Durand Line invalid. This led to border tensions with Pakistan. Afghanistan's governments have periodically refused to recognize Pakistan's inheritance of British treaties regarding the region. As had been agreed to by the Afghan governments following the Second Anglo-Afghan War, and after the treaty ending Third Anglo-Afghan War, no option was available to cede the territory to the Afghans, even though Afghanistan continued to claim the entire region as it was part of the Durrani Empire prior the conquest of the region by the Sikhs in 1818.

During the 1950s, Afghanistan supported the Pushtunistan Movement, a secessionist movement that failed to gain substantial support amongst the tribes of the North-West Frontier Province. Afghanistan's refusal to recognize the Durrand Line, and its subsequent support for the Pashtunistan Movement has been cited as the main cause of tensions between the two countries that have existed since Pakistan's independence.

After the Afghan-Soviet War, Khyber Pakhtunkhwa has become one of the areas of top focus for the War against Terror. The province has been reported to struggle with the issues of crumbling schools, non-existent healthcare, and lack of any sound infrastructure while areas such as Islamabad and Rawalpindi receive priority funding.

In 2010 the name of the province changed to "Khyber Pakhtunkhwa". Protests arose among the locals of the Hazara division due to this name change, as they began to demand their own province. Seven people were killed and 100 injured in protests on 11 April 2011.

Geography 

Khyber Pakhtunkhwa sits primarily on the Iranian plateau and comprises the junction where the slopes of the Hindu Kush mountains on the Eurasian plate give way to the Indus-watered hills approaching South Asia. This situation has led to seismic activity in the past. The famous Khyber Pass links the province to Afghanistan, while the Kohalla Bridge in Circle Bakote Abbottabad is a major crossing point over the Jhelum River in the east.

Geographically the province could be divided into two zones: the northern zone extending from the ranges of the Hindu Kush to the borders of the Peshawar basin and the southern zone extending from Peshawar to the Derajat basin.

The northern zone is cold and snowy in winters with heavy rainfall and pleasant summers with the exception of the Peshawar basin, which is hot in summer and cold in winter. It has moderate rainfall.

The southern zone is arid with hot summers and relatively cold winters and scanty rainfall. The Sheikh Badin Hills, a spur of clay and sandstone hills that stretch east from the Sulaiman Mountains to the Indus River, separates Dera Ismail Khan District from the Marwat plains of the Lakki Marwat. The highest peak in the range is the limestone Sheikh Badin Mountain, which is protected by the Sheikh Badin National Park. Near the Indus River, the terminus of the Sheikh Badin Hills is a spur of limestone hills known as the Kafir Kot hills, where the ancient Hindu complex of Kafir Kot is located.

The major rivers that criss-cross the province are Kabul, Swat, Chitral, Kunar, Siran, Panjkora, Bara, Kurram, Dor, Haroo, Gomal, and Zhob.

Its snow-capped peaks and lush green valleys of unusual beauty have enormous potential for tourism.

Climate
The climate of Khyber Pakhtunkhwa varies immensely for a region of its size, encompassing most of the many climate types found in Pakistan. The province stretching southwards from the Baroghil Pass in the Hindu Kush covers almost six degrees of latitude; it is mainly a mountainous region. Dera Ismail Khan is one of the hottest places in South Asia while in the mountains to the north the weather is mild in the summer and intensely cold in the winter. The air is generally very dry; consequently, the daily and annual range of temperature is quite large.

Rainfall also varies widely. Although large parts of Khyber Pakhtunkhwa are typically dry, the province also contains the wettest parts of Pakistan in its eastern fringe especially in monsoon season from mid-June to mid-September.

Chitral District
Chitral District, due to its location, is completely sheltered from the monsoon that controls the weather in eastern Pakistan, owing to its relatively westerly location and the shielding effect of the Nanga Parbat massif. In many ways, Chitral District has more in common regarding climate with Central Asia than South Asia. The winters are generally cold even in the valleys, and heavy snow during the winter blocks passes and isolates the region. In the valleys, however, summers can be hotter than on the windward side of the mountains due to lower cloud cover: Chitral can reach  frequently during this period. However, the humidity is extremely low during these hot spells and, as a result, the summer climate is less torrid than in the rest of the Indian subcontinent.

Most precipitation falls as thunderstorms or snow during winter and spring, so that the climate at the lowest elevations is classed as Mediterranean (Csa), continental Mediterranean (Dsa) or semi-arid (BSk). Summers are extremely dry in the north of Chitral district and receive only a little rain in the south around Drosh.

At elevations above , as much as a third of the snow which feeds the large Karakoram and Hindukush glaciers comes from the monsoon since these elevations are too high to be shielded from its moisture.

Central Khyber Pakhtunkhwa

On the southern flanks of Nanga Parbat and in Upper and Lower Dir Districts, rainfall is much heavier than further north because moist winds from the Arabian Sea are able to penetrate the region. When they collide with the mountain slopes, winter depressions provide heavy precipitation. The monsoon, although short, is generally powerful. As a result, the southern slopes of Khyber Pakhtunkhwa are the wettest part of Pakistan.

This region's climate is classed at lower elevations as humid subtropical (Cfa in the west; Cwa in the east); whilst at higher elevations with a southerly aspect, it becomes classed as humid continental (Dfb). However, accurate data for altitudes above  are practically nonexistent here, in Chitral, or in the south of the province.

The seasonality of rainfall in central Khyber Pakhtunkhwa shows very marked gradients from east to west. At Dir, March remains the wettest month due to frequent frontal cloud bands, whereas in Hazara more than half the rainfall comes from the monsoon. This creates a unique situation characterized by a bimodal rainfall regime, which extends into the southern part of the province described below.

Since cold air from the Siberian High loses its chilling capacity upon crossing the vast Karakoram and Himalaya ranges, winters in central Khyber Pakhtunkhwa are somewhat milder than in Chitral. Snow remains very frequent at high altitudes but rarely lasts long on the ground in the major towns and agricultural valleys. Outside of winter, temperatures in central Khyber Pakhtunkhwa are not so hot as in Chitral. 

Significantly higher humidity when the monsoon is active means that heat discomfort can be greater. However, even during the most humid periods the high altitudes typically allow for some relief from the heat overnight.

Southern Khyber Pakhtunkhwa
As one moves further away from the foothills of the Himalaya and Karakoram ranges, the climate changes from the humid subtropical climate of the foothills to the typically arid climate of Sindh, Balochistan and southern Punjab. As in central Khyber Pakhtunkhwa, the seasonality of precipitation shows a very sharp gradient from west to east, but the whole region very rarely receives significant monsoon rainfall.

Temperatures in southern Khyber Pakhtunkhwa are extremely hot: Dera Ismail Khan in the southernmost district of the province is known as one of the hottest places in the world with temperatures known to have reached . In the cooler months, nights can be cold and frosts remain frequent; snow is very rare, and daytime temperatures remain comfortably warm with abundant sunshine.

National parks
There are about 29 National Parks in Pakistan and 7 in Khyber Pakhtunkhwa.

Demographics

The current province of Khyber Pakhtunkhwa had a population of 35.5 million at the time of the 2017 Census of Pakistan. Over 83% of the population lived in rural areas.

The largest ethnic group are the Pashtuns, who historically have been living in the areas for centuries. Around 1.5 million Afghan refugees also remain in the province, the majority of whom are Pashtuns followed by Tajiks, Hazaras, Gujjar and other smaller groups. Despite having lived in the province for over two decades, they are registered as citizens of Afghanistan.

The Pashtuns of Khyber Pakhtunkhwa observe tribal code of conduct called Pashtunwali which has four high value components called nang (honor), badal (revenge), melmastiya (hospitality) and nanawata (rights to refuge).

Language

Urdu, being the national and official language, serves as a lingua franca for inter-ethnic communications, and sometimes Pashto and Urdu are the second and third languages among communities that speak other ethnic languages.

The most widely spoken language is Pashto, native to 78.89% of the population and spoken throughout the province. Other languages with significant numbers of speakers include Hindko (11.48%) and Saraiki (3.72%). Hindko is spoken in the southern part of Hazara division in the northeast, and Hindko was once the predominant language of Peshawar before Pashtun settlement in the city. Saraiki-speakers are found in Dera Ismail Khan district in the far south of the province. Languages that the census recorded as 'Other' were 5.99% of the population, overwhelmingly Dardic languages spoken in the mountainous northeast of the province including Chitral, Kohistan and the upper parts of Manshera, Dir and Swat valleys. The most prominent of these are Khowar, spoken in Chitral, and Kohistani, spoken in the Kohistan region. In 2011 the provincial government approved in principle the introduction of Pashto, Saraiki, Hindko, Khowar and Kohistani as compulsory subjects for schools in the areas where they are spoken.

Religion

The overwhelming majority of the residents of the Khyber Pakhtunkhwa follows and professes the Sunni Islam while the small number of Shias of Islam are found among the Isma'ilis in the Chitral district. The tribe of Kalasha in southern Chitral still retain an ancient form of Hinduism mixed with Animism, a faith once dominant in the mountainous upper northeast of the district. There are very small numbers of residents who are the adherents of Roman Catholicism denomination of Christianity, Hinduism and Sikhism, mainly living in Peshawar and other urban centres.

Villages
 

Kalāla

Government and politics 

Political leanings and the Legislative branch

The Provincial Assembly is a unicameral legislature, which consists of 145 members elected to serve for a constitutionally bounded term of five years. Historically, the province perceived to be a stronghold of the Awami National Party (ANP); a pro-Russian, by procommunist, left-wing and nationalist party. Since the 1970s, the Pakistan Peoples Party (PPP) also enjoyed considerable support in the province due to its socialist agenda. Khyber Pakhtunkhwa was thought to be another leftist region of the country after Sindh.

After the nationwide general elections held in 2002, a plurality voting swing in the province elected one of Pakistan's only religiously based provincial governments led by the ultra-conservative Muttahida Majlis-e-Amal (MMA) during the administration of President Pervez Musharraf. The American involvement in neighboring Afghanistan contributed towards the electoral victory of the Islamic coalition led by Jamaat-e-Islami Pakistan (JeI) whose social policies made the province a ground-swell of anti-Americanism. The electoral victory of MMA was also in context of guided democracy in the Musharraff administration that barred the mainstream political parties, the leftist Pakistan Peoples Party and the centre-right Pakistan Muslim League (N) (PML(N)), whose chairmen and presidents having been barred from participation in the elections.

Policy enforcement of a range of social restrictions, though the implementation of strict Shariah was introduced by the Muttahida Majlis-e-Amal government the law was never fully enacted due to objections of the Governor of Khyber Pakhtunkhwa backed by the Musharraff administration. Restrictions on public musical performances were introduced, as well as a ban prohibiting music to be played in public places as part of the "Prohibition of Dancing and Music Bill, 2005" – which led to the creation of a thriving underground music scene in Peshawar. The Islamist government also attempted to enforce compulsory hijab on women, and wished to enforce gender segregation in the province's educational institutions. The coalition further tried to prohibit male doctors from performing ultrasounds on women, and tried to close the province's cinemas. In 2005, the coalition successfully passed the "Prohibition of Use of Women in Photograph Bill, 2005," leading to the removal of all public advertisements that featured women.

At the height of Taliban insurgency in Pakistan, the religious coalition lost its grip in the general elections held in 2008, and the religious coalition was swept out of power by the leftist Awami National Party which also witnessed the resignation of President Musharraf in 2008. The ANP government eventually led the initiatives to repeal the major Islamist's social programs, with the backing of the federal government led by PPP in Islamabad. Public disapproval of ANP's leftist program integrated in civil administration with the sounded allegations of corruption as well as popular opposition against religious program promoted by the MMA swiftly shifted the province's leniency away from the left in 2012. In 2013, the provincial politics shifted towards populism and nationalism when the PTI, led by Imran Khan, was able to form the minority government in coalition with the JeI; the province now serves as the stronghold of the PTI and is perceived as one of the more right wing areas of the country. After the 2018 election, PTI increased their seat share and formed a majority government.

In non-Pashtun areas, such as Abbottabad, and Hazara Division, the PML(N), the centre-right party, enjoys considerable public support over economical and public policy issues and has a substantial vote bank.

Executive Branch

The executive branch of the Kyber Pakhtunkhwa is led by the Chief Minister elected by popular vote in the Provincial assembly while the Governor, a ceremonial figure representing the federal government in Islamabad, is appointed from the necessary advice of the Prime Minister of Pakistan by the President of Pakistan.

The provincial cabinet is then appointed by the Chief Minister who takes the Oath of office from the Governor. In matters of civil administration, the Chief Secretary assists the Chief Minister on executing its right to ensure the writ of the government and the constitution.

Judicial Branch

The Peshawar High Court is the province's highest court of law whose judges are appointed by the approval of the Supreme Judicial Council in Islamabad, interpreting the laws and overturn those they find unconstitutional.

Administrative divisions and districts

Khyber Pakhtunkhwa is divided into seven Divisions – Bannu, Dera Ismail Khan, Hazara, Kohat, Malakand, Mardan, and Peshawar. Each division is split up into anywhere between two and nine districts, and there are 36 districts in the entire province. Below you can find a list showing each district ordered by alphabetical order. A full list showing different characteristics of each district, such as their population, area, and a map showing their location can be found at the main article.

 Abbottabad District
 Allai District
 Bajaur District
 Bannu District
 Battagram District
 Buner District
 Charsadda District
 Central Dir District
 Dera Ismail Khan District
 Hangu District
 Haripur District
 Karak District
 Khyber District
 Kohat District
 Kolai-Palas District
 Kurram District
 Lakki Marwat District
 Lower Chitral District
 Lower Dir District
 Lower Kohistan District
 Lower South Waziristan District
 Malakand District
 Mansehra District
 Mardan District
 Mohmand District
 North Waziristan District
 Nowshera District
 Orakzai District
 Peshawar District
 Shangla District
 Swabi District
 Swat District
 Tank District
 Tor Ghar District
 Upper South Waziristan District
 Upper Chitral District
 Upper Dir District
 Upper Kohistan District

Major cities

Peshawar is the capital and largest city of Khyber Pakhtunkhwa. The city is the most populous and comprises more than one-eighth of the province's population.

Economy

Khyber Pakhtunkhwa has the third largest provincial economy in Pakistan. Khyber Pakhtunkhwa's share of Pakistan's GDP has historically comprised 10.5%, although the province accounts for 11.9% of Pakistan's total population. The part of the economy that Khyber Pakhtunkhwa dominates is forestry, where its share has historically ranged from a low of 34.9% to a high of 81%, giving an average of 61.56%. Currently, Khyber Pakhtunkhwa accounts for 10% of Pakistan's GDP, 20% of Pakistan's mining output and, since 1972, it has seen its economy grow in size by 3.6 times.

Agriculture remains important and the main cash crops include wheat, maize, tobacco (in Swabi), rice, sugar beets, as well as fruits are grown in the province.

Some manufacturing and high-tech investments in Peshawar have helped improve job prospects for many locals, while trade in the province involves nearly every product. The bazaars in the province are renowned throughout Pakistan. Unemployment has been reduced due to the establishment of industrial zones.

Workshops throughout the province support the manufacture of small arms and weapons. The province accounts for at least 78% of the marble production in Pakistan.

Infrastructure
The Sharmai Hydropower Project is a proposed power generation project located in the Upper Dir District of Khyber Pakhtunkhwa on the Panjkora River with an installed capacity of 150MW.

Social issues
The Awami National Party sought to rename the province "Pakhtunkhwa", which translates to "Land of Pakhtuns" in the Pashto language. This was opposed by some non pashtuns in the province and political parties such as the Pakistan Muslim League-N (PML-N) and Muttahida Majlis-e-Amal (MMA), due to the PML-N deriving its support in the province from primarily non-Pashtun Hazara regions.

In 2010 the announcement that the province would have a new name led to a wave of protests in the Hazara region. On 15 April 2010 Pakistan's senate officially named the province "Khyber Pakhtunkhwa" with 80 senators in favour and 12 opposed. The MMA, who until the elections of 2008 had a majority in the Khyber Pakhtunkhwa government, had proposed "Afghania" as a compromise name.

After the 2008 general election, the Awami National Party formed a coalition provincial government with the Pakistan Peoples Party. The Awami National Party has its strongholds in the Pashtun areas of Pakistan, particularly in the Peshawar valley, while Karachi in Sindh has one of the largest Pashtun populations in the world—around 7 million by some estimates. In the 2008 election, the ANP won two Sindh assembly seats in Karachi. The Awami National Party has been instrumental in fighting the Taliban. In the 2013 general election Pakistan Tehreek-e-Insaf won a majority in the provincial assembly and has now formed their government in coalition with Jamaat-e-Islami Pakistan.

Non-government organisations
The following is a list of some of the major NGOs working in Khyber Pakhtunkhwa:
 Al-Khidmat Foundation
 Aurat Foundation
 Shaukat Khanum Memorial Cancer Hospital & Research Centre
 Sarhad Rural Support Programme
 Human Rights Commission of Pakistan
 Frontier Education Foundation

Folk music and culture
Pashto folk music is popular in Khyber Pakhtunkhwa and has a rich tradition going back hundreds of years. The main instruments are the rubab, mangey and harmonium. Khowar folk music is popular in Chitral and northern Swat. The tunes of Khowar music are very different from those of Pashto, and the main instrument is the Chitrali sitar. A form of band music composed of clarinets (Surnai) and drums is popular in Chitral. It is played at polo matches and dances. The same form of band music is played in the neighbouring Northern Areas.

Education 

Sources:

Khyber Pakhtunkhwa has traditionally had a very low literacy rate, although this is changing in recent times. As of the 2017 census, the literacy rate for Khyber Pakhtunkhwa (including FATA) is 51.66%. In rural areas, the literacy rate is 48.44% of the population while in urban areas it is 66.86%. Khyber Pakhtunkhwa has a huge gap in literacy rate between sexes – for men it is 66.67% while the female literacy rate is 34.58%, just over half the male literacy rate. This gap is particularly prominent in the overwhelmingly-Pashto rural areas, where traditional gender norms have generally limited education of women. As of 2021, Khyber Pakhtunkhwa (KP) has the highest literacy growth rate in the whole country (Pakistan) 

This is a chart of the education market of Khyber Pakhtunkhwa estimated by the government in 1998.

Public medical colleges
Khyber Pakhtunkhwa (KPK) province has 9 government medical colleges:
 Khyber Medical University, Peshawar
 Bannu Medical College, Bannu
 Khyber Girls Medical College, Peshawar
 Ayub Medical College, Abbottabad
 Bacha Khan Medical College, Mardan
 Gajju Khan Medical College Swabi
 Gomal Medical College, D.I.Khan
 Nowshera Medical College, Nowshera
 Saidu Medical College Swat

Engineering universities 
 CECOS University of Information Technology and Emerging Science, Peshawar
 National University of Sciences and Technology, Islamabad- College of Aeronautical Engineering, Risalpur Campus
 COMSATS Institute of Information Technology, Islamabad (Abbottabad Campus)
 City University of Science and Information Technology, Peshawar
 Gandhara Institute of Science & Technology, PGS Engineering College (University of Engineering & Technology, Peshawar)
 Ghulam Ishaq Khan Institute of Engineering Sciences and Technology, Topi-Swabi
 Iqra University Peshawar (Formerly Iqra University, Karachi (Peshawar Campus)
 National University of Sciences and Technology, Islamabad- Military College of Engineering, Risalpur Campus
 National University of Computer & Emerging Sciences, Islamabad (Peshawar Campus)
 University of Engineering & Technology, Peshawar (Main Campus)
 University of Engineering and Technology, Peshawar (Mardan Campus)
 University of Engineering & Technology, Peshawar (Bannu Campus)
 University of Engineering & Technology, Peshawar (Abbottabad Campus)
 University of Engineering & Technology, Peshawar (Kohat Campus)
 Sarhad University of Science and Information Technology, Peshawar
 Abasyn University, Peshawar
 University of Science and Technology, Bannu
 IMSciences, Peshawar
Gomal University, Dera Ismail Khan

Major educational establishments 
 Cadet College Kohat
 Edwardes College, Peshawar
 Abdul Wali Khan University, Mardan 
 Islamia College University, Peshawar
 University of Agriculture, Peshawar
 University of Malakand, Chakdara
 University of Peshawar, Peshawar
 Khyber Medical College, Peshawar

Sports
Cricket is the main sport played in Khyber Pakhtunkhwa. It has produced world-class sportsmen like Shahid Afridi, Younis Khan, Khushdil Shah, Fakhar Zaman and Umar Gul. Besides producing cricket players, Khyber Pakhtunkhwa has the honour of being the birthplace of many world-class squash players, including greats like Hashim Khan, Qamar Zaman, Jahangir Khan and Jansher Khan.

Tourism

See also
 Northern Pakistan
 List of cities in Khyber Pakhtunkhwa by population
 List of cultural heritage sites in Khyber Pakhtunkhwa
 List of hospitals in Khyber Pakhtunkhwa
 List of populated places in Khyber Pakhtunkhwa
 Khyber Pakhtunkhwa clothing
 Provincial Highways of Khyber Pakhtunkhwa
 Tourism in Khyber Pakhtunkhwa
 North-West Frontier Province
 Federally Administered Tribal Areas

Notes

References

External links 

 
 Khyber Pakhtunkhwa tourism corporation

 
2005 Kashmir earthquake
Durand Line
Pashto-speaking countries and territories
Provinces of Pakistan
States and territories established in 1970